Cobb Galleria is a large office park with six skyscrapers located in the Cumberland/Vinings district of  Cobb County in the U.S. state of Georgia. Its location is sandwiched between  Marietta,  Smyrna,  Sandy Springs and the City of  Atlanta. It is near many hotels and parks, the Cumberland Mall (accessible by a pedestrian bridge), the Cobb Galleria Centre, the Cobb Energy Performing Arts Center and the intersections of Interstate 75 and  Interstate 285. It also adjoins other large business and residential districts, including the Vinings Overlook and Circle 75.

External links 
 

Buildings and structures in Cobb County, Georgia
Convention centers in Georgia (U.S. state)